Tarsabad (also Romanized as Tarsābād) is a village in Qatur Rural District, Qatur District, Khoy County, West Azerbaijan Province, Iran. At the 2006 census, its population was 539, in 104 families.

References 

Populated places in Khoy County